Janaki Vishwanathan  is an Indian film maker best known for her National Award-winning debut film  Kutty (2001) in Tamil, which focuses on the issue of child labour. Her second film, Kanavu Meippada Vendum, deals with the issues faced by Devadasi women.  This was screened at several film festivals

Filmography
Kutty (2001) : Tamil Film
Kanavu Meippada Vendum (2004) : Tamil Film
Yeh Hai Bakrapur (2014) : Hindi Film
chandikaiyin kadhai  : Tamil Tele Film

Awards
 2002 Cairo International Children's Film Festival (Egypt)- Special International Jury Prize — Kutty
 2002 National Film Awards (India)- Silver Lotus Award — Special Jury Award — Kutty

References

Living people
Indian women film directors
Tamil film directors
21st-century Indian film directors
Tamil screenwriters
Special Jury Award (feature film) National Film Award winners
Year of birth missing (living people)